This is a list of Harlequin Romance novels released in 1949.

Releases

References 

1949 novels
Lists of Harlequin Romance novels